Moto G8 (stylized by Motorola as moto g8) is a series of Android smartphones developed by Motorola Mobility, a subsidiary of Lenovo. It is the eighth generation of the Moto G family. The G8 Play and G8 Plus were first released in October 2019, only 8 months after the previous generation. Other variants were released in March and April 2020.

Release 

The G8 Plus and Play were announced in October 2019 and released in October and November 2019 in Europe and Latin America; an international version was also released. The G8 Power was announced in February 2020, followed by the G8 in March 2020. The G8 and G8 Power were released in Europe and Latin America in March and April 2020. The G8 Power Lite was announced and released in April 2020 for Europe and Latin America.

Specifications 

Some specifications such as wireless technologies and storage will differ between regions.

Reception

G8 Plus
The G8 Plus was met with mixed to positive reviews by critics. The Verge gave it a score of 8/10, praising its battery life and day to day performance, among others, while criticizing the lack of wireless charging, water resistance, Android 10, and camera performance. Android Authority gave it a score of 6.8/10, positively describing the usability, action camera, and build quality, while criticizing the performance and camera image quality. TechRadar gave it a score of 3.5/5.

References 

Android (operating system) devices
Mobile phones introduced in 2019
Mobile phones with multiple rear cameras
Motorola smartphones
Discontinued smartphones